"Young Man's Fancy" is episode 99 of the American television anthology series The Twilight Zone.

Opening narration

Plot
A newly married husband and wife return to the husband's late mother's home where he grew up. The plan is to get the house ready to sell. He finds it very difficult to leave the place, let alone sell it, and he can't bear it. In the house, his new wife is bothered by constant reminders that the mother is somehow present in the house and vying for her son's loyalty. Eventually the man becomes so engrossed in childhood memories that his mother reappears, and he becomes a child again. His wife accuses the mother of causing this, but the mother says it was not her doing. The husband—now a young boy—tells his "wife" to "Go away, lady—we don't need you anymore." The horror-struck wife flees the house, leaving her boy-husband and his spectral mother behind.

Closing narration

References
DeVoe, Bill. (2008). Trivia from The Twilight Zone. Albany, GA: Bear Manor Media. 
Grams, Martin. (2008). The Twilight Zone: Unlocking the Door to a Television Classic. Churchville, MD: OTR Publishing.

External links

1962 American television episodes
The Twilight Zone (1959 TV series season 3) episodes
Television episodes written by Richard Matheson
Television episodes about ghosts